Acrocercops haplocosma is a moth of the family Gracillariidae, known from Java, Indonesia. It was described by Edward Meyrick in 1936. The hostplant for the species is Calophyllum inophyllum.

References

haplocosma
Moths of Asia
Moths described in 1936